Guashna was a Tongva village located at Playa Vista, Los Angeles at the mouth of Ballona Creek. The site has also been referred to as Sa'angna (or some variation thereof), with various sources debating whether Sa'angna, meaning "place of tar," was a regional referent rather than a village name or whether it was a separate nearby village. Sa'angna is also not to be confused with Suangna. The Tongva referred to the Ballona Wetlands as Pwinukipar, meaning "full of water."

Prior to the arrival of European settlers, tar located near the village, possibly at what was later renamed Baldwin Hill, was an important resource for the village in the construction of te'aats and for trade. In 2004, four-hundred burials in the area were unearthed in the construction of a drainage ditch in the Playa Vista development. The Tongva had little power to prevent the desecration despite numerous protests.

History

Prosperous village 

Tar was reportedly an important resource of Guashna, which was used in trade with numerous neighboring villages and for the Tongva's production of te'aats to navigate the coastline.

The village was a point of departure to the island of Pimu (renamed Santa Catalina by the Spanish), which is located about twenty two miles from the village site, that had economic and cultural significance. Tongva's prosperous villages on the island would trade quarried soapstone, pierced white shell, abalone, and sea otter skins. Evidence of this trade can be found as far east as the native Pueblo peoples of what is now New Mexico. No other village village throughout mainland Tovaangar was as important for coastal trade and connection with the islands.

The coastal village of Puvunga was a major regional trading center located about twenty miles down the coastline.

Colonization 
Like other Tongva villages in the area, the village declined with the arrival of Spanish missionaries and soldiers. The villagers were brought to Mission San Gabriel, where they were baptized and forced to work in conditions that were identified by third-party observers as being slavery "in every sense of the word." 

At Mission San Gabriel, there were a total of 7,854 baptisms (2,459 children) and 5,656 deaths (2,916 children) until secularization in 1834, indicating a very high rate of death. Children often died very young at the missions. One missionary reported that three out of every four children born at nearby Mission San Gabriel died before reaching the age of two.

In the 1820s, while the villagers were at Mission San Gabriel and the village had been depleted, the governor of Alta California granted the land area, referred to as Guaspita, a variant of Guashna, as "a land grant received by Antonio Ignacio Ávila, which later was combined with the Salinas land grant to become Rancho Sausal Redondo, present-day Westchester."

Development and desecration 

Until the 1960s, the village site was primarily used for cropland by the Machado family, remaining a natural spreading floodplain of Ballona Creek. Developments increasingly encroached on the agricultural area where the village site was located as Los Angeles sprawled outward. 

In the 1990s, protests began to protect the village site from what was to be Dreamworks Studio at Playa Vista. After an environmentalist's hunger strike, director Steven Spielberg decided to not build the studio at that site.

In 2004, the construction of a drainage ditch for the Playa Vista development unearthed four hundred ancestral remains or burials in the area. California cemetery statutes that stem back to the 1850s, amidst the California Genocide, strategically excluded the protection of native cemeteries or burial grounds from desecration. The village site was disturbed for commercial and residential development without protection. As a non-federally recognized tribe, the Tongva had little control over their ancestral remains or artifacts to stop the development.

In 2005, "Phase II" of the Playa Vista development threatened to destroy the site. Continued developments in the area continue to threaten further destruction of the site as of 2021.

See also 

 Genga
 Lupukngna
 Moyongna
 Yaanga

References 

Tongva populated places
Former Native American populated places in California
History of Los Angeles
History of Los Angeles County, California